The College for Advanced Studies in Social Theory (TEK) is the oldest independent college of leftist-intellectual orientation at Corvinus University of Budapest as well as in Hungary.

History 

TEK is the second oldest, still operating, college in Hungary. It was founded in 1981 by young researchers and students. Its orientation can be divided into two parts: vocational work and community life. The first is well documented, the latter is somewhat more distorted, due to the effects of collective memory.

1981–present 

TEK seceded from the first established college in Hungary, the Rajk László College for Advanced Studies.
However, in the beginning - before the fall of the Iron Curtain - the College's main topic was the reinterpretation of Marx's ouvre, since liberal and alternative thinking was only possible if it was related to Marxist studies. With the fall of the iron curtain, this coercion disappeared, and since the College's main profile was its diversity and openness to new ideas, philosophies and theories, the College's profile now freely and rapidly ramified into diverse - and pioneering among the Hungarian colleges at that time - topics: environmentalism, sustainability, postmodernism, anarchism, postmarxism, sociolinguistics, phenomenology, post-structuralism, Buddhist economics, feminism, sociology of minorities, queer studies, postcolonialism, network theory. The College also dealt with the topic of squatting, the sociological causes of poverty and since the establishment the farmost detailed analysis of critical theory/Frankfurt school among other colleges.

Philosophical principles

Criticism 

TEK is providing a critical approach to the economical theories that Corvinus University has in its educational program– among others, focusing on the social inequalities human resources, structuralism, neoliberalism, functionalism, corporatism inherently bares -.
TEK is also involved in highly regarded green activism, such as critical mass, gay pride, many flashmobs, that are held in support of promoting a livable environment. Among the members of TEK are also permanent supporters of the anti-g8 anti-g20 demonstrations.

Commune 
The TEK started a lifestyle experiment, by establishing - again firstly - the habit of an annual commune,  in which the members apply voluntarily. These communes give the participants the opportunity to experience such a lifestyle that is hard to experience among European capitalist societies. In these communities the members share all goods, live together in one place creating a highly tied community of a few.

Aims 

TEK’s main aim is a critical approach to the topics taught in Corvinus University.
TEK is more of a theoretical college, putting theoretical approaches to the questions of the society in front of bare statistical analysis, processing of data.
However members of TEK – individually - are highly involved in diverse fields of practice – e.g. organizing conferences on behalf of the homeless, many voluntary work promoting the reintegration of gypsies into the labour market, helping the educational development of those from less developed areas -.

Vocational work

Tutorials 

The base of the vocational work in TEK are the annual or semi-annual Tutorials. The topics of these Tutorials are given by the members of the College, which Tutorials are to be held by the tutors after compiling a schedule. The participants analyse, discuss the literature together with the tutor. As a conclusion, at the end of every tutorial, the participants are to hand in an essay of one of the topics that were discussed during the Tutorial.
The main frame for the Tutorials are based on 5 main fields: political economy, economics of globalization, Frankfurt School, green and ethical economics, postmodern sociology.
Every fresher has to participate in the Ground Tutorial, which provides a brief insight to the work and schedule of all five fields.

Related works 

Fordulat (meaning “facing” or “twist”) is the official periodical of the College, dealing with many critical and however yet not mainstream, but pioneering topics.

Conferences 

Among many others, Claus Offe, one of the leading political sociologists and of the second generation Frankfurt School attended one of the conferences held by the College.

Related links 

left wing politics 
neo-marxism
postmodernism 
globalism
environmentalism
buddhist economics 
post-colonialism
lgbt
egalitarianism 
situationalism 
anarchism
Corvinus University of Budapest 
Széchenyi István College for Advanced Studies 
Frankfurt School
Philosophy of music
Bobos in Paradise

External links 
official website – in Hungarian
Corvinus University of Budapest - in English
official periodical – in Hungarian

Corvinus University of Budapest
Educational institutions established in 1981
Marxist organizations
Social theories
1981 establishments in Hungary